SX Corvi is an eclipsing binary star system in the constellation Corvus, ranging from apparent magnitude 8.99  to 9.25 over 7.6 hours. The system is a contact binary also known as a W Ursae Majoris variable, where the two component stars orbit closely enough to each other for mass to have been transferred between them—in this case the secondary having transferred a large amount of mass to the primary.

Yildiz and colleagues estimated the age of the system at 7.32 ± 0.97 billion years based on study of the properties of the system and estimated rate of mass transfer. They found the current masses of the primary and secondary to be 1.25 ± 0.04 and 0.10 ± 0.01 solar masses respectively, from their original masses of   0.72 ± 0.02 and 1.68 ± 0.05 solar masses.

References

Corvus (constellation)
W Ursae Majoris variables
F-type main-sequence stars
061825
110139
Corvi, SX